St. Laurence's Church, Long Eaton, is a Grade II* listed parish church in Long Eaton, England. 11th century

History

The church dates from the 12th century.  It was largely rebuilt between 1868 and 1869 by the architect George Edmund Street. The old church was made to form the south aisle. A north aisle, nave and chancel were added in the same style as the old building. The contractor was Mr Hunt of Long Eaton. The pews were replaced with open seating. A new pulpit was carved by Thomas Earp. Two stained-glass windows by Ward and Hughes were inserted in the chancel, and a window by Hardman & Co. was inserted in the south aisle. The cost of the works was £3,000 (equivalent to £ in )  and the church re-opened on 26 August 1869.

In 1886 St James' Church, Long Eaton was opened as a mission church on Tamworth Road.

The chancel roof was decorated in 1936 by Wystan Widdows.

Originally a chapel of ease to All Saints' Church, Sawley, it became an independent parish in the 19th century.

It is a Forward in Faith parish.

Organ

The pipe organ dates from 1896 when an instrument was installed by Brindley & Foster. There were subsequent modifications to this in 1951 by Henry Willis and 1986 by the Johnson Organ Company. Details of the organ can be found on the National Pipe Organ Register.

Bells
The tower contains a ring of 8 bells installed in 1972 by John Taylor of Loughborough.

See also
Grade II* listed buildings in Erewash
Listed buildings in Long Eaton

References

Long Eaton
Long Eaton
Long Eaton
Anglo-Catholic churches in England receiving AEO